is a song recorded by Japanese singer Mai Kuraki. It was released on February 8, 2006 through Giza Studio as the second single from her sixth studio album, Diamond Wave (2006). The track was written by Kuraki and Akihito Tokunaga, while the production was taken by Kuraki and Kannonji. A rock-influenced J-pop song, "Best of Hero" lyrically cheers up those who are struggling with the personal issues, calling them "heroes".

"Best of Hero" served as the Japanese television drama series, Gachibaka! (2006). The song reached number five in Japan, becoming Kuraki's 23rd consecutive top ten in the country since her debut single, "Love, Day After Tomorrow" (1999).

Track listing

Charts

Daily charts

Weekly charts

Monthly charts

Certification and sales

|-
! scope="row"| Japan (RIAJ)
| None
| 57,741 
|-
|}

Release history

References

Mai Kuraki songs
2006 singles
2006 songs
Songs with music by Akihito Tokunaga
Songs written by Mai Kuraki
Song recordings produced by Daiko Nagato